Georges Caudron (20 November 1952 – December 2022) was a French actor and artistic director. He was very active in dubbing and was notably the French voice for David Duchovny, Steven Culp, John Hannah, Willie Garson, and Peter Bergman.

Caudron studied under Jean-Laurent Cochet at the National School of Arts and Techniques of Theatre École nationale supérieure des arts et techniques du théâtre.

Filmography

Cinema
 (1981)
 (2006)

Television
Adios (1976)
 (1977)
 (1978)
 (1979)
 (1979)
 (1980)
Médecins de nuit (1980)
 (2001)

References

1952 births
2022 deaths
20th-century French male actors
21st-century French male actors
French male film actors
French male television actors
French artistic directors
People from Malakoff